Broadwell is a village and civil parish about  south-west of Carterton in West Oxfordshire. The 2011 Census recorded the parish's population as 218.

Parish church
The Church of England parish church of Saints Peter and Paul is a late Norman church built in about 1190. In about 1250 the bell tower and octagonal spire were built, the north and south transepts were added, the chancel remodelled and an arch was inserted in the north wall of the chancel, linking it to a new north chapel. The south wall of the chancel also has a window added early in the 14th century. A Perpendicular Gothic arch linking the north transept and chapel was inserted. In the 15th century a stair-turret was added to reach a room over the north transept. The church was restored under the direction of E.G. Bruton in 1873. It is a Grade I listed building.

The tower has an historic ring of five bells from the 14th to the 17th centuries, plus a more recent Sanctus bell. Currently all are unringable. The second bell is the oldest, cast by an unknown founder in about 1349. The tenor was cast in about 1500 by Thomas Hasylwood, whose kinsman William Hasylwood had bell-foundries at Reading and Wokingham. The fourth bell was cast in 1581 by Joseph Carter, whose kinsman William Carter was a bell-founder at Reading and then at the Whitechapel Bell Foundry. Edward Neale of Burford cast the third bell in 1653 and the treble in 1663. Thomas Rudhall of Gloucester cast the Sanctus bell in 1778.  The parish is now part of the Benefice of Shill Valley and Broadshire.

Village cross
By the main road through the village near the parish church are the remains of a Medieval village cross. It comprises a stone shaft set on an octagonal base of four steps, probably made in the 15th century. It is Grade II* listed.

RAF Broadwell
The airfield was in service from 1943 until 1947 and was used by Royal Air Force Transport Command.

Amenities

Broadwell had a public house, the Five Bells. It is now the Chilli Pepper bed and breakfast house.

Attractions
The Cotswold Wildlife Park is within the parish.

References

Sources and further reading

External links

Civil parishes in Oxfordshire
Villages in Oxfordshire
West Oxfordshire District